McCormick Gap is a wind gap located in the Blue Ridge Mountains east of Rockfish Gap.

References

Landforms of Augusta County, Virginia
Landforms of Albemarle County, Virginia
Transportation in Virginia
Wind gaps of Virginia
Blue Ridge Mountains
Shenandoah National Park
Blue Ridge Parkway